"City of Gods" is a song by American rappers Fivio Foreign and Kanye West and American singer Alicia Keys. It was released as the lead single from Fivio's debut studio album B.I.B.L.E. and  the second single from West's album, Donda 2. On the song, Keys interpolates the chorus from "New York City" (2015) by The Chainsmokers. The track was certified Gold by the Recording Industry Association of America, indicating 500,000 units recorded in the US and was nominated at the 54th NAACP Image Awards for Outstanding Hip Hop/Rap Song.

Background
West and Fivio Foreign first worked together for the song "Off the Grid", released on West's album Donda in 2021. The collaboration came together after West called Fivio Foreign to record in Mercedes Benz Stadium the night before the listening event for Donda. According to Fivio Foreign, West praised the verse the rapper recorded for "Off the Grid" and said that he reminds him of Jay-Z. Before Donda released, Fivio Foreign told his fans on Twitter that West was executive producing and performing on his upcoming album B.I.B.L.E. On February 5, 2022, Fivio Foreign tweeted "I ain't gon lie, Ye gave me the feature of the Yr.. He was talking 2 crazy on that verse" [sic]".

When Fivio Foreign first got the beat for "City of Gods", it featured a sample of the 2015 track "New York City" by The Chainsmokers. When playing it for West, he said "Yo, I see something with this song" and asked Fivio to send the beat so he could change it around. One of the changes West made was taking out the sample and getting Keys to sing the vocals instead. Originally Fivio was rapping "Ain't no king of New York, nobody really in charge", and when he played it for West, he said "You gotta say you're the king of New York". Fivio Foreign then suggested that he should rap " Pop was the king of New York, now I'm the one that's in charge" (thereby paying tribute to late drill rapper Pop Smoke) which West responded to by saying "Yo that's even better!".

The song is dedicated to late rapper, friend of Fivio Foreign and longtime collaborator TDott Woo, who was shot and killed a week before the release of the song. In a statement put up with the release of the song, Fivio said "T Dot. That's my baby boy. I never thought I'd be doing this without you here with me. You supposed to be here with me but you gon' always be the prince in the City of Gods. Your name will forever live through with me. Long Live Prince T Dot."

Critics reception 
The song has been compared to the collaboration Empire State of Mind (2009) by Jay-Z and Alicia Keys, in addition to the release of the second version that references in its title Empire State of Mind (Part II) Broken Down, featured on Keys' album The Element of Freedom.

Complex's writers have associated the song with both Empire State of Mind and Run This Town, appreciating the combination of Foreign's drill music with Kayne's production, even though "the glitzy synth made it feel like American Eagle drill; [...] Just too glossy"  and that "overall, it’s a bit of an oblong song". At the end Alicia Keys was prized for her "singing reverently about New York City; [...] with impressive vocals on the chorus". Christine Ochefu by GQ is pleasantly impressed to find Keys on a drill track.

Personnel
Credits adapted from Tidal.

Music
 Vocals – Fivio Foreign, Kanye West, Alicia Keys
 Additional vocals – Playboi Carti
 Production – AyoAA, Hemz, Kanye West, Lil Mav, Ojivolta, The Chainsmokers, Tweek Tune
 Co-production – Dem Jointz
 Misc. production – BoogzDaBeast, Bordeaux, Mike Dean, Non Native, Scoop

Technical
 Mix engineering – Mike Dean
 Master engineering – Mike Dean
 Recording engineer – John Cunningham, Non Native, Shaan Singh, Fritz Owens, Luca Zadra
 Assistant engineer – Sean Solymar, Tommy Rush

City of Gods (Part II) 

On April 7, 2022, Alicia Keys released a solo version of the song with a stripped back production called "City of Gods (Part II)". The video of the song was nominated at the 2022 MTV Video Music Awards in the Best R&B category.

Charts

Weekly charts

Year-end charts

Certifications

Release history

References

2022 singles
2022 songs
Fivio Foreign songs
Alicia Keys songs
Kanye West songs
Song recordings produced by Kanye West
Song recordings produced by the Chainsmokers
Songs written by Andrew Taggart
Songs written by Dem Jointz
Songs written by Fivio Foreign
Songs written by Kanye West
Songs written by Mike Dean (record producer)
Songs written by Alicia Keys
Song recordings produced by Alicia Keys
Columbia Records singles